Peter Godly Michael (born 10 May 1998) is a Nigerian professional footballer who plays for Norwegian club Grorud IL as a forward.

Career

Club
In February 2018, Michael signed a four-year contract with Eliteserien side Vålerenga.

Career statistics

Club

References

1998 births
Living people
Nigerian footballers
Nigeria under-20 international footballers
Nigeria youth international footballers
Nigerian expatriate footballers
Nigerian expatriate sportspeople in Norway
Expatriate footballers in Norway
Vålerenga Fotball players
Skeid Fotball players
Øygarden FK players
Sogndal Fotball players
Eliteserien players
Norwegian Second Division players
Norwegian First Division players
Association football forwards